Daring Game is a 1968 drama film starring Lloyd Bridges and Nico Minardos, filmed at the Ivan Tors studio in Miami and in the Bahamas. The working title was The Unkillables.

Plot
Survival Devices, Inc., is an organization that employs a team of adventurers known as "the Flying Fish" who are adept in sky diving, scuba diving and martial arts. They are engaged to rescue a captured scientist imprisoned on a Caribbean island by a dictator.

The team parachutes off the coast of the island in a HALO jump and establishes an inflatable underwater basecamp in an "Instant Underwater Habitat" or "Igloo".

Cast
 Lloyd Bridges as Vic Powers
 Joan Blackman as Kathryn Carlyle
 Nico Minardos as Ricardo Balboa
 Michael Ansara as President Delgado
 Shepperd Strudwick as Dr. Carlyle
 Brock Peters as Jonah
 Perry Lopez as Reuben

Production notes
A Chase YC-122 Avitruc hired by the producers crashed en route from Fort Lauderdale to Bimini.

Ricou Browning directed the underwater sequences.

See also
List of American films of 1968

Notes

External links

1968 films
1960s action drama films
American action drama films
Films scored by George Bruns
Films set in the Caribbean
Paramount Pictures films
Underwater action films
1968 drama films
Films directed by László Benedek
1960s English-language films
1960s American films